Ivo de Figueiredo (born 30 April 1966) is a Norwegian historian, biographer and literary critic.

He was awarded the Brage Prize in 2002, for a biography of Johan Bernhard Hjort. He has written several books on Henrik Ibsen and his works.

Figueiredo hails from Langesund, and graduated as cand.philol. from the University of Oslo in 1994.

References

1966 births
Living people
People from Bamble
20th-century Norwegian historians
Norwegian biographers
Norwegian male writers
Male biographers
21st-century Norwegian historians
Henrik Ibsen researchers
University of Oslo alumni
Male non-fiction writers